This article contains a list of proposed and prototype wave power devices.

References

External links